Miles Greenwood (born 30 August 1987, in Oldham, Greater Manchester) is an English former professional rugby league footballer who played as a fullback or winger for the Leigh Centurions, Halifax, Batley Bulldogs and the Rochdale Hornets in the Championship.

Playing career
Greenwood came through the junior systems of Oldham and St Helens.

He has spent time on loan at the Widnes Vikings and has previously played for the Leigh Centurions, Oldham R.L.F.C., Batley Bulldogs and Halifax.

Greenwood is the cousin of England dual code international Kyle Eastmond.

References

External links
Rochdale Hornets profile
Halifax RLFC profile
Halifax profile

1987 births
Living people
Batley Bulldogs players
English rugby league players
Halifax R.L.F.C. players
Leigh Leopards players
Oldham R.L.F.C. players
Rochdale Hornets players
Rugby league fullbacks
Rugby league players from Oldham
Rugby league wingers
Widnes Vikings players
English people of Jamaican descent